Purogamana Kala Sahitya Sangham (Progressive Arts & Literary Organisation) an Association for Art and Letters, also known as the PuKaSa, is an organization of artists, writers and art and literature enthusiasts based in Kerala. The association was formed on August 14, 1981, under the leadership of Malayalam poet Vyloppilli Sreedhara Menon.

Presidents of the PuKaSa 
 Vyloppilli Sreedhara Menon (1981–1985)
 M. K. Sanu (1988–1990)
 M. N. Vijayan (1990–2000)
 N. V. P. Unithiri (2000–2002)
 Kadammanitta Ramakrishnan (2002–2008)
 U. A. Khader (2008–2013)
 Vaisakhan (2013–2018)
 Shaji N. Karun (2018–Present)

General Secretary of PuKaSa 
 Ashokan Charuvil (2018–Present)

External links
 EMS as a literary critic and cultural activist

Indic literature societies
Arts organisations based in India
Arts organizations established in 1981
Culture of Kerala
Malayalam-language literature
1981 establishments in Kerala